Chavakkad, formerly Chowghat, is a municipality in Thrissur district  of Kerala state in India. It is a suburban town of Thrissur city. Chavakkad is noted for its beach and fishing.

History
Chavakkad (Koottungal) is famous for its communal harmony and diversity among people. The famous Manathala Juma Masjid situated in Chavakked. St. Thomas Church which is founded by St. Thomas the Apostle in 52 AD is situated at Palayoor, Chavakkad is believed to be the first church in South Asia. Manathala Vishwanatha temple is another landmark in Chavakkad. Koottungalangadi is famous for trade in the earlier era. The town's anglicized name was Chowghat. It was renamed Chavakkad in the early 1970s, much earlier than other towns and cities in Kerala were renamed.

Demographics

 India census, Chavakkad had a population of 38,138. Males constitute 46% of the population and females 54%. Chavakkad has an average literacy rate of 81%, higher than the national average of 59.5%; with male literacy of 83% and female literacy of 79%. 11% of the population is under 6 years of age.

Government
The Chavakkad Panchayath was established in 1918. Later on 1 October 1978, the Panchayat was upgraded to the status of a Municipality with an area of 12.41 km2 and is divided into 27 electoral wards. In 2010, the electoral wards were increased to 29. The municipality has a total population of 37,789 and has a density of 3,045 per km2. Chavakkad is a Grade-III Municipality and the headquarters of the Chavakkad Taluk.
Chavakkad houses the Judicial First Class Magistrate Court and Munsif Courts. It also has a Sub Jail.

Education
Chavakkad educational district has 93 high schools, three special schools, one Kalamandalam arts school, two schools for the deaf, and a fisheries’ school. Kadappuram Government Higher Secondary School, M.R.R.M.H.S, St Joseph's School, I.D.C IEHS, St Francis ICSE School, Amrita Vidyalayam, Rajah School, MIC English School, National Huda School, Focus IEHS School, Sree Narayana Vidyaniketan Central School, and V.R. Appu Master Memorial Higher Secondary School are some of the prominent schools in and near Chavakkad.

Transport

Road

National Highway 66, commonly referred to as NH 66, passes through the Chavakkad town.
This busy National Highway runs roughly north–south along the western coast of India, parallel to Western Ghats. It connects Mumbai to Cochin, passing through the states of Maharashtra, Goa, Karnataka, and Kerala. Another road is State Highway 50 that starts in Chavakkad and ends in Wadakkancherry. The highway is 31.515 km long. Chavakkad has a municipal bus stand with frequent buses to and from Ernakulam, Kozhikode, Ponnani, the district headquarters Thrissur and to other nearby towns. All private and KSRTC buses that ply southward from Guruvayur and other northern towns stop at Chavakkad.

Railway
The nearest railway station to Chavakkad is  about four kilometers away. Guruvayur railway station lies in the Thrissur–Guruvayur section. Thrissur railway station is the major railhead near to Chavakkad from where you can get all South Indian and North Indian trains.

Airport
All international, domestic and chartered flights are available here. Calicut International Airport at Karipur is about 104 km away.

Business
Chavakkad is an important trading center for copra, coir, and fish. The major source of revenue in Chavakkad has repatriated income mainly from the Non-Resident Indians working in the Middle East. The place is called as Mini Gulf. The Rajah Group, owners of famous Kajah Beedi, Rajah Tiles, Rajah Motors has its headquarters in Chavakkad. The Kaja Beedi Company was started in the year 1948 by Hajee Abdul Khader. Rajah Motors, which produced the first multi-purpose vehicle (MPV) in India, known by the name ‘Tiger’ and ‘Kangaroo’, has its factory and offices in Chavakkad.

Tourism
 Chavakkad Beach: Located on the coast of Arabian Sea in West Coast, Chavakkad Beach is counted amongst Kerala's most popular beaches. It is two kilo metres from the Chavakkad town. Chavakkad Beach is famous for the spectacle called 'Azhimokam' in Malayalam which means a place where a river confluences with the sea.
St. Thomas Church (Palayur): Located at Palayur, according to Saint Thomas Christian tradition, the Syrian church was established in 52 AD by St Thomas, one of the twelve apostles of Jesus Christ. Palayoor Syro-Malabar church is the oldest Christian Church in India and is called an Apostolic Church credited to the Apostolate of St. Thomas who preached and also started conversion of people to Christianity here. The main feast is observed in the month of July. The 3rd of July is the day of "Dukhrana" which is observed as a remembrance day of St Thomas the apostle. And the Sunday which comes after the tenth of the month is observed as the day of "Tharpana" to remember the first christening ceremony done by St Thomas the apostle at the Thaliyakulam near to the church.
Guruvayur Temple: Located very close (4 km east) to Chavakkad, this is a major shrine in India. It is the fourth temple in India by the number of pilgrims, after Badrinath, Tirupati and Puri. It has a standing four-armed Lord Vishnu as the main deity, facing east. This idol is believed to be worshipped by Vasudeva and Devaki, parents of Lord Krishna, an avatar himself and later by Lord Krishna himself. The legend says that after Lord Krishna ascended to heaven after his earthly life, Dwaraka, where he lived, got flooded and Brihaspati, the Guru of Devas and Vayu, the wind god took the idol and with the help of Lord Shiva, they consecrated it on a special place. As the idol was consecrated by Guru and Vayu, the place came to be known as Guruvayoor and the main deity came to be known as Guruvayurappan. Though the main idol is that of Lord Vishnu, devotees consider the deity as Lord Krishna, mainly in his infant form. There are many legends which show the greatness of the temple. The most important festival is that in the month of 'Kumbham', which starts with hosting the flag on Pooyam day and ends with the holy bath on Anizham day. Next goes to Guruvayur Ekadasi and Ashtami Rohini in the months of 'Vrischikam' and 'Chingam' respectively. Mandalakalam, Kuchela Dinam, Thursdays, etc. are also celebrated with great pomp. Lord Ganapathi, Ayyappan and Durga are the sub-deities. Udayasthamana Pooja and Krishnanattam are the main offerings. Thanthram goes to Puzhakkara Chennas family, while the high priests (Melsanthi) are the Namboothiri Brahmins from Sukapuram & Peruvanam villages in ancient Kerala. The temple is well known for the number of elephants and cows. There are more than 60 elephants and 500 cows in the temple. The elephants are accommodated at Punnathoor Kotta, 3 km north of the temple, and cows are accommodated at Vengad in Malappuram district, almost 60 km north-east of Guruvayoor. The temple is managed by Guruvayoor Devaswom, an autonomous temple body under the Government of Kerala, with 12 small temples under its control.
Manathala Mosque & Nercha : Manathala Mosque is a famous and old mosque in Chavakkad.This mosque is a very sacred place for the people following Islamic faith. The architecture of this ancient mosque is simple, yet a classic. It has a dome and four minarets, and the building is whitewashed and the edges are lined with green borders. The interior of the mosque is the same as other mosques. Manathala Mosque is flamboyantly decorated during the annual festival called nercha, which happens during the month of January–February. Throngs of people from different religions visit the mosque and the festival goes on for 4 days. This Nercha is conducting in remembrance of a martyr called "Hydrous Kutty Moopar" general of Hyder Ali buried in the courtyard of the mosque. Hydrous Kutty Moopar fought for justice and truth and was a trusted lieutenant of Hyder Ali.

See also
Kadalaayimana
Ponnani

External links
Chavakkad Municipality Official Page

References

Cities and towns in Thrissur district